Loukas Mavrokefalidis (alternate spelling: Mavrokefalides) (Greek: Λουκάς Μαυροκεφαλίδης; born July 25, 1984) is a Greek professional basketball player and the team captain for Ionikos Nikaias of the Greek Basket League. He has also represented the senior Hellenic national team.  Born in Jeseník, Czechoslovakia, he is a 2.10 m (6'10 "), 120 kg (265 lbs.) power forward and center. He was selected by the Minnesota Timberwolves in the 2nd round (57th overall) of the 2006 NBA draft.

Professional career

Europe
Mavrokefalidis started his professional career with PAOK, after moving to Thessaloniki from Kilkis, where his parents come from. From the first days of his professional career, PAOK head coach Bane Prelević took advantage of his height and decided to play him at the center position, which, as it was proved later in his career, fit him very well.

Mavrokefalidis played for PAOK in the Greek Basket League during the Greek League 2005–06 season, averaging 16.7 points and 8.4 rebounds per game. He played in the Greek All-Star Game and he won the Greek League's Most Improved Player Award that year. After many months of hard work, Mavrokefalidis was almost always a member of the starting five in PAOK, creating havoc to the opposition's defense with his ability to get to the rim and make easy buckets or exciting dunks. He also became a defensive force, chasing down rebounds relentlessly, something that can be shown by the 8.4 rebounds per game that he averaged during the 2005–06 season.

During the summer of 2006, Mavrokefalidis was signed by Virtus Roma of the Italian League and EuroLeague, but he was not established as a key member of the team, averaging just 2 points and 1 rebound per game. In February 2007, he was transferred from Roma to Pamesa Valencia of the Spanish ACB League, in exchange for Roberto Chiacig and Jon Stefánsson. On July 12, 2007, Mavrokefalidis joined Olympiacos. In 2008, Mavrokefalidis moved to Maroussi. In 2009, he re-signed with Olympiacos through the 2010–11 season.

In 2011, Mavrokefalidis was signed by the Russian League club Spartak Saint Petersburg to a 2-year contract worth €2.4 million euros net income. He was named to the All-EuroCup Second Team in 2013. He signed with the Spanish League club FC Barcelona in May 2013.

On 10 July 2013, even though the Greek media were saying that Mavrokefalidis was very close to signing with Olympiacos, he was instead announced as a signing of Panathinaikos. In the 2015 Greek Basket League playoffs, he was the best player for Panathinaikos, averaging 18.4 points, 8.1 rebounds (5.8 offensive rebounds), and 2.2 assists per game.

On August 10, 2015, he signed a one-year deal with AEK Athens. Mavrokefalidis was the top scorer of AEK Athens in the 2015–16 Greek Basket League season, averaging 14.5 points per game.

China
In December 2016, Mavrokefalidis joined the Chinese Basketball Association (CBA) club Qingdao DoubleStar Eagles for the 2016–17 CBA season. He became the first Greek player to ever play in China. He averaged 19.2 points, 8.8 rebounds, 2.3 assists, and 1.5 steals per game.

Back to Europe
On February 20, 2017, Mavrokefalidis returned to the Greek club AEK Athens, signing a contract with them for the rest of the season. On September 25, 2017, Mavrokefalidis signed with Lithuanian club Lietuvos rytas Vilnius, for the 2017–18 season.

In 2018, he joined the Greek A2 League club Ionikos Nikaias. On December 23, 2019, after a very productive and successful stint with Ionikos, Mavrokefalidis transferred to the Greek EuroCup club Promitheas Patras, in order to replace Georgios Bogris on the club's roster. 

Mavrokefalidis signed with Peristeri on July 3, 2020. On December 8, 2020, he returned to Ionikos, after a fallout with newly appointed Peristeri coach (and his former Panathinaikos boss), Argyris Pedoulakis. 

Mavrokefalidis started the 2021-22 campaign with 2nd division club Tritonas Sepolion, bringing them to the brink of Greek Basket League promotion, before returning once again to Ionikos Nikaias and helping them avoid relegation. In 6 games with Ionikos, he averaged 19.3 points, 7.8 rebounds and 2.5 assists, playing around 30 minutes per contest. On September 1, 2022, Mavrokefalidis renewed his contract with Ionikos.

National team career

Greek junior national team
Mavrokefalidis helped Greece win the bronze medal at the 2003 FIBA Under-19 World Cup. He also played at the 2004 FIBA Europe Under-20 Championship. In 2005, Mavrokefalidis' contribution during the FIBA Under-21 World Cup was very significant, as Mavrokefalidis greatly helped the Greece men's national under-21 basketball team win the silver medal, after losing to Lithuania by just two points in the gold medal game.

Greek men's national team
A year later, in 2006, the Greece men's national basketball team head coach Panagiotis Giannakis was impressed by the Mavrokefalidis' abilities and called him to participate in the Greek men's basketball training camp, one month before the 2006 FIBA World Championship took place in Japan. However, as he was selected in the 2006 NBA draft by the Minnesota Timberwolves, Mavrokefalidis informed the coach shortly before the outset of the World Championship that he had decided to go back to Minnesota and participate in performance improvement training camps, and thus he lost the team's 12th man roster place to Sofoklis Schortsanitis.

In 2011, Mavrokefalidis was given a 2-month suspension from all competitions by the Hellenic Basketball Federation, for refusing to play for Greece's national team for the second consecutive summer. However, two years later, he played with the Greek senior men's national team at the EuroBasket 2013.

Career statistics

Domestic leagues

Regular season

|-
| 2001–02
| style="text-align:left;"|PAOK
| align=left | 
| 2 || 3.4 || .000 || .000 || .000 || 1.5 || 0.0 || 0.0 || 0.0 || 0.0
|-
| 2002–03
| style="text-align:left;"|PAOK
| align=left | 
| 6 || 4.3 || .636 || .000 || 1.000 || 0.8 || 0.1 || 0.3 || 0.1 || 3.0
|-
| 2003–04
| style="text-align:left;"|PAOK
| align=left | 
| 19 || 11.3 || .535 || .500 || .861 || 3.6 || 0.4 || 0.3 || 0.4 || 4.9
|-
| 2004–05
| style="text-align:left;"|PAOK
| align=left | 
| 14 || 7.0 || .423 || .000 || .562 || 1.7 || 0.1 || 0.2 || 0.1 || 2.2
|-
| 2005–06
| style="text-align:left;"|PAOK
| align=left | 
| 26 || 31.5 || .553 || .276 || .796 || 8.1 || 1.0 || 0.7 || 0.5 || 16.5
|-
| 2007–08
| style="text-align:left;"|Olympiacos
| align=left | 
| 17 || 9.4 || .534 || .000 || .800 || 2.3 || 0.8 || 0.2 || 0.1 || 3.1
|-
| 2008–09
| style="text-align:left;"|Maroussi
| align=left | 
| 26 || 24.2 || .485 || .280 || .811 || 5.7 || 1.1 || 0.6 || 0.5 || 12.0
|-
| 2009–10
| style="text-align:left;"|Olympiacos
| align=left | 
| 20 || 15.0 || .644 || .400 || .851 || 2.9 || 0.9 || 0.6 || 0.3 || 7.9
|-
| 2010–11
| style="text-align:left;"|Olympiacos
| align=left | 
| 24 || 17.2 || .548 || 1.000 || .790 || 4.2 || 0.7 || 0.5 || 0.5 || 9.0
|-
| 2013–14
| style="text-align:left;"|Panathinaikos
| align=left | 
| 25 || 13.3 || .579 || .400 || .756 || 3.7 || 1.2 || 0.3 || 0.2 || 6.8
|-
| 2014–15
| style="text-align:left;"|Panathinaikos
| align=left | 
| 19 || 12.2 || .441 || .400 || .678 || 3.2 || 0.9 || 0.7 || 0.3 || 5.2
|-
| 2015–16
| style="text-align:left;"|AEK Athens
| align=left | 
| 26 || 25.3 || .459 || .431 || .810 || 6.7 || 2.0 || 0.7 || 0.4 || style="background:#cfecec;"|14.5
|}

Playoffs

|-
| 2001–02
| style="text-align:left;"|PAOK
| align=left | 
| 2 || 1.3 || 1.000 || .000 || .000 || 1.0 || 0.0 || 0.0 || 0.0 || 2.0
|-
| 2003–04
| style="text-align:left;"|PAOK
| align=left | 
| 2 || 5.1 || 1.000 || .000 || .500 || 0.0 || 0.0 || 0.0 || 0.0 || 1.5
|-
| 2005–06
| style="text-align:left;"|PAOK
| align=left | 
| 3 || 28.1 || .434 || .000 || .500 || 4.6 || 1.0 || 0.3 || 1.0 || 7.0
|-
| 2007–08
| style="text-align:left;"|Olympiacos
| align=left | 
| 7 || 13.1 || .700 || .500 || 1.000 || 2.4 || 0.2 || 0.4 || 0.0 || 3.1
|-
| 2008–09
| style="text-align:left;"|Maroussi
| align=left | 
| 10 || 23.2 || .476 || .166 || .862 || 5.0 || 1.6 || 0.7 || 0.3 || 10.7
|-
| 2009–10
| style="text-align:left;"|Olympiacos
| align=left | 
| 9 || 8.4 || .551 || 1.000 || .888 || 1.5 || 0.1 || 0.3 || 0.0 || 4.5
|-
| 2010–11
| style="text-align:left;"|Olympiacos
| align=left | 
| 9 || 21.3 || .571 || .000 || .772 || 3.2 || 1.4 || 0.4 || 0.2 || 11.6
|-
| 2013–14
| style="text-align:left;"|Panathinaikos
| align=left | 
| 10 || 15.2 || .465 || .500 || .823 || 3.6 || 0.7 || 0.5 || 0.7 || 10.9
|-
| 2014–15
| style="text-align:left;"|Panathinaikos
| align=left | 
| 9 || 26.0 || .548 || .384 || .678 || 8.1 || 2.2 || 0.7 || 0.3 || 18.4
|}

FIBA Champions League

|-
| style="text-align:left;" | 2016–17
| style="text-align:left;" | A.E.K.
| 2 || 21.3 || .312 || - || .857 || 9.0 || 1.0 || 1.5 || 0 || 11.0
|}

Awards and accomplishments

Greek junior national team
 2003 FIBA Under-19 World Cup:  
 2005 FIBA Under-21 World Cup:

Pro clubs
 6× Greek League All-Star: 2006, 2009, 2011, 2014, 2020, 2022
 Greek League Most Improved Player: 2006
 Greek League  rebounding leader: (2006)
 4× Greek Cup winner: 2010, 2011, 2014, 2015
 All-EuroCup Second Team: 2013
 Greek League champion: 2014
 Greek Cup MVP: 2015
 2× Greek League Best Five: 2015, 2016
 2× EuroCup MVP of the Round: 2015–16 (Regular Season Round 1 & 2)
 2015–16 EuroCup Highest Index Rating in a game: 55
 2015–16 EuroCup Most points in a game: 42
 Greek 2nd Division Champion: 2019
 Greek 2nd Division Top Scorer: (2019)
 Greek 2nd Division rebounding leader: (2019)

References

External links
 Euroleague.net Profile
 FIBA Archive Profile
 FIBA Europe Profile
 Eurobasket.com Profile
 Greek Basket League Profile 
 Greek Basket League Profile 
 Hellenic Federation Profile 
 Italian League Profile 
 Spanish League Profile 
 EuroCup Loukas Mavrokefalidis Article

1984 births
Living people
AEK B.C. players
BC Rytas players
BC Spartak Saint Petersburg players
Centers (basketball)
FC Barcelona Bàsquet players
Greek Basket League players
Greek expatriate basketball people in China
Greek expatriate basketball people in Italy
Greek expatriate basketball people in Russia
Greek expatriate basketball people in Spain
Greek men's basketball players
Greek people of Czech descent
Ionikos Nikaias B.C. players
Liga ACB players
Maroussi B.C. players
Minnesota Timberwolves draft picks
Olympiacos B.C. players
Pallacanestro Virtus Roma players
Panathinaikos B.C. players
P.A.O.K. BC players
Peristeri B.C. players
Sportspeople from Kilkis
Power forwards (basketball)
Promitheas Patras B.C. players
Qingdao Eagles players
Valencia Basket players